Thomas Smythe or Smith of London, Ashford and Westenhanger, Kent (1522–7 June 1591) was the collector of customs duties (also known as a "customer") in London during the Tudor period, and a member of parliament for five English constituencies. His son and namesake, Sir Thomas Smythe (died 1625), was the first governor of the East India Company, treasurer of the Virginia Company, and an active supporter of the Virginia colony.

Family
Thomas Smythe, born in 1522, was the second son of John Smythe (d. 1538) and Joan Brouncker, the daughter of Robert Brouncker of Melksham, Wiltshire. John, a substantial yeoman and clothier of Corsham, Wiltshire, left Smythe a farm in the Hundred of Amesbury, Wiltshire, that provided an annual income of £20. After his father's death, Smythe moved to London to seek his fortune; Smythe was approximately 16 at the time.

Career
Smythe joined his father's merchant guild, the Haberdashers, and then the Worshipful Company of Skinners. In 1550, Smythe developed a close connection with Sir Andrew Judde, Lord Mayor of London. About four years later, Smythe married Judde's daughter, Alice Judde.

During the reign of Mary I of England, Smythe purchased the Office of the Customs from one Mr. Cocker for £2,500. He was confirmed in his appointment at the Customs on the accession of Elizabeth I in 1558, and he continued in the office for 11 years. In 1567, he appears to have incurred her Majesty's severe displeasure, having been accused of issuing privy warrants leading to a £6,000 loss; his friend William Cecil, Lord Burghley, intervened and helped Smythe escape imprisonment. Cecil persuaded the Queen to be lenient, arguing that if Smythe was allowed more time he would repay this loss.

Elizabeth began to require larger and larger fines to renew Smythe's leases in order to replenish her exchequer. Over time, Smythe became unable to meet these demands and again fell under her Majesty's severe displeasure. His October 1589 counteroffer of a more modest payment was rejected. Due to his increasing infirmities and perhaps the stress of trying to meet the Queen's demands, Smythe died 18 months later, on 7 June 1591, leaving his widow, then 60 years old, 6 sons and 6 daughters.

Smythe was a member of parliament (MP) for Tavistock October 1553, for Aylesbury April 1554, Rye November 1554, Winchelsea 1555, and Portsmouth 1563.

Marriage and issue

Thomas Smythe had 13 children with his wife, Alice Judde. They are as follows:

Andrew Smythe, eldest son, who died an infant.
Sir John Smythe (1557–1608), second son, of Ostenhanger, in 1576 married Elizabeth Fineaux (daughter of Sir John Fineaux, Chief Justice of the King's Bench).
Sir Thomas Smythe (1558–1625), who married firstly, Judith Culverwell, the daughter of Richard Culverwell; secondly Joan Hobbs, the daughter of William Hobbs; and thirdly, Sarah Blount, the daughter of William Blount. He had no issue by his first two marriages; by his third marriage he had three sons and a daughter. His widow, Sarah, married Robert Sidney, 1st Earl of Leicester.
Henry Smythe of Corsham (d. before 1591) married Elizabeth Owen (daughter of Thomas Owen, Justice of the Peace).
Sir Richard Smythe (d. 1628), also said to have been of Leeds Castle, who married firstly Elizabeth Scott, the daughter of Sir Thomas Scott (and widow of John Knatchbull), and in 1589 married Jane White (daughter of John White of London, widow of Samuel Thornhill).
Sir Robert Smythe of Leeds Castle, fourth son, who married Elizabeth Scott, the daughter of Thomas Scott of Scott's Hall, Kent.
Symon Smythe, killed at the siege of Cadiz in 1596. Also said to be of Highgate, and to have married Ann Lynford (daughter of William Lynford).
Elizabeth Smythe, who was unmarried at the time of Smythe's death in 1591, and later married Sir Henry Fanshawe (son of Thomas Fanshawe who married secondly Sir Henry's wife's sister).
Mary Smythe, who married Robert Davy or Davis of London, Receiver for Wales.
Joan Smythe, who married Thomas Fanshawe, Esquire of Ware Park (d. 1601).
Katherine Smythe, who married, at age sixteen, Sir Rowland Hayward, Lord Mayor of London in 1571, then Sir John Scott (1570-1616) of Nettlestead, Kent, son of Sir Thomas Scott of Scot's Hall in Kent and Elizabeth Baker of Sissinghurst; her mural monument survives in Nettlestead Church. Thirdly to Sir Richard Sandys.
Alice Smythe, who married William Harris, also said to have been Sir William Harris of Crixes, Woodham, Essex.
Ursula Smythe, who married William Butler. Also said to have married Simon Harding of London, then secondly marrying William Boteler (Butler) of Bedford.

Notes

References
 
 
 
Hearn, Karen, ed. Dynasties: Painting in Tudor and Jacobean England 1530-1630. New York: Rizzoli, 1995. .

External links
Will of Sir Andrew Judde, proved 16 March 1559, National Archives Retrieved 13 April 2013

1522 births
1591 deaths
Members of the Parliament of England for Tavistock
Politicians from London
People from Ashford, Kent
English MPs 1553 (Mary I)
English MPs 1554
English MPs 1554–1555
English MPs 1555
English MPs 1563–1567
People from Westenhanger